Talk About It may refer to:

Music
 Talk About It (EP) Glenn Hughes
 Talk About It (Nicole C. Mullen album)
 "Talk About It" (Boom Crash Opera song), 1990
 "Talk About It", a 1968 song and single by Harumi, project of Tom Wilson (record producer)
 "Talk About It", a 1974 song and single by The Diamonds (Jamaican group)
 "Talk About It", a 1996 song by Glenn Hughes from Addiction
 "Talk About It", a 2008 song and single by The Metros
 "Talk About It", a 2015 song by Paradise Fears
 "Talk About It", a 2015 song by Dr. Dre from Compton